The fifth season of the reality television series Love & Hip Hop: New York aired on VH1 from December 15, 2014 until April 13, 2015. The show was primarily filmed in New York City, New York. It was executively produced by Mona Scott-Young and Stephanie R. Gayle for Monami Entertainment, Toby Barraud, Stefan Springman, David DiGangi and Ian Gelfand for Eastern TV, and Susan Levison, Nina L. Diaz and Vivian Gomez for VH1.

The series chronicles the lives of several women and men in the New York area, involved in hip hop music. It consists of 17 episodes, including a two-part reunion special hosted by Nina Parker.

Production
On January 30, 2014, VH1 announced the renewal of Love & Hip Hop for a fifth season. The series premiered on December 15, 2014. With the exception of Tahiry Jose, Erica Jean and K. Michelle, all of whom left or were fired from the show, the rest of the main cast members from last season returned, along with Cyn Santana, who was promoted to the main cast, and Chink Santana's girlfriend Chrissy Monroe. Producer Cisco Rosado joined the supporting cast, along with Darryl Strawberry's daughter Diamond Strawberry, Chink Santana and aspiring performers Precious Paris and Jhonni Blaze.

On April 14, 2015, VH1 announced that Love & Hip Hop: The Wedding, a two-hour special featuring the marriage between cast members Yandy Smith and Mendeecees Harris, would air live on May 25, 2015. The special was preceded by six exclusive webisodes that were made available on VH1's website from May 12, 2015. The special aired to over 2 million viewers and featured appearances from other VH1 reality stars, including cast mates from Love & Hip Hop: Atlanta, Love & Hip Hop: Hollywood, Black Ink Crew, Mob Wives, as well as from Bravo's The Real Housewives of Atlanta.

Synopsis
Yandy welcomes Mendeecees home from jail. Cyn and Erica's relationship comes to a violent end. Amina is preparing to give birth to Peter's child but he keeps running back to Tara. Diamond Strawberry has left her daughter in Los Angeles to pursue a relationship with producer Cisco Rosado in New York, but they are both hiding secrets from each other. Socialite Chrissy Monroe is ready to start a family with rapper Chink Santana.

Cast

Starring

 Yandy Smith (17 episodes)
 Tara Wallace (16 episodes)
 Cyn Santana (17 episodes)
 Chrissy Monroe (15 episodes)
 Amina Buddafly (16 episodes)
 Erica Mena (15 episodes)

Also starring

 Mendeecees Harris (16 episodes)
 Peter Gunz (16 episodes)
 Diamond Strawberry (13 episodes)
 Cisco Rosado (15 episodes)
 Chink Santana (12 episodes)
 Rich Dollaz (16 episodes)
 Precious Paris (8 episodes)
 Jhonni Blaze (10 episodes)
 Rashidah Ali (8 episodes)

Kimbella Vanderhee returns in a guest role. Diamond's mother Lisa Strawberry, Erica's friend Albee Yours, Mendeecees' assistant Remy, Cisco's mother Maggie and his baby mama Tasha appear in several episodes as guest stars. The show also features minor appearances from notable figures within the hip hop industry and the cast's inner circle, including Yandy's cousin Maurice Talton, Amina's sisters Jazz & Sophie Schmahl, Black Ink Crews Ceasar and Dutchess, Erica's mother Sonia, Yandy's artist J. Dinero, Samantha Wallace, Judy Harris, Kim Wallace, DJ Kay Slay, Uncle Murda, Charlie Murphy, Amina's manager Orrin Ennis, Rich's mother Jewel Escobar, Darryl Strawberry, Yandy's mother Laura Smith and Cyn's boyfriend Ray Stacks.

Episodes

Webisodes

Check Yourself
Love & Hip Hop New York: Check Yourself, which features the cast's reactions to each episode, was released weekly with every episode on digital platforms.

Bonus scenes
Deleted scenes from the season's episodes were released weekly as bonus content on VH1's official website.

Music
Several cast members had their music featured on the show and released singles to coincide with the airing of the episodes.

References

External links

2014 American television seasons
2015 American television seasons
Love & Hip Hop